The Four Bandits, Four Outlaws or the Four Desperados was a nickname given to a group of 4 young students in Hong Kong who were keen on discussing the current issues in China, and aspired to overthrow the Manchu-led Qing dynasty. The four bandits were Yeung Hok-ling, Sun Yat-sen, Chan Siu-bak and Yau Lit.  "Yeung Yiu Kee" (楊耀記), Yeung's family shop located at 24 Gough Street in Hong Kong, used to be the meeting place of the bandits.  One of the Four Bandits, Sun Yat-sen later became the leader of China Revolutionary Alliance and the first Provisional President of the Republic of China.  At the Dr Sun Yat-sen Museum, statues made out of wax were made of the exact picture taken.

References

Chinese revolutionaries
Chinese outlaws
Quartets
Sun Yat-sen
History of Hong Kong